Navajo Nation Scenic Byways, also called Navajo Nation Scenic Roads, are roads to Navajo Nation sites of scenic or historic significance.

The plans for Navajo National Scenic Byways were developed by a task force including the Arizona Department of Transportation, and Bureau of Indian Affairs. It is administered with the Federal Highway Administration.

List 
The following table is a list of Navajo Nation Scenic Byways:

A related byway is the Trail of Ancients Scenic Byway in New Mexico. It was designated a byway for its prehistoric archaeological sites.

See also

References

External links 
 Navajo Nation Scenic Roads (official site)

Scenic Byways
Scenic highways in Arizona
Scenic highways in New Mexico
Scenic highways in Utah
Native American-related lists
Arizona geography-related lists
New Mexico geography-related lists
Utah geography-related lists